In 2001 Tipperary competed in the National Hurling League and the Munster and All-Ireland championships. It was Nicky English's third year in charge of the team with Tommy Dunne also in his third year as team captain. Finches continued as sponsors of Tipperary GAA. 

Tipperary won the treble of League, Munster and All-Ireland titles.

National Hurling League

Division 1B

2001 Munster Senior Hurling Championship

2001 All-Ireland Senior Hurling Championship

Awards
Tipperary went on to win seven All Star Awards with Brendan Cummins, Philip Maher, Éamonn Corcoran, Tommy Dunne, Eddie Enright, Mark O'Leary, and Eoin Kelly all winning awards. Tommy Dunne was also named as the Hurler of the year with Eoin Kelly winning the Young hurler of the year award.

References

External links
Tipperary GAA Archives 2001
2001 Teams and Results at Premierview
Tipperary v Clare 3 June 2001 on YouTube
2001 Munster Final on YouTube
2001 All-Ireland Hurling Final on YouTube

Tipp
Tipperary county hurling team seasons